Bolivarianism is a mix of panhispanic, socialist and national-patriotic ideals named after Simón Bolívar, the 19th-century Venezuelan general and liberator from the Spanish monarchy then in abeyance, who led the struggle for independence throughout much of South America.

Bolivarianism of Hugo Chávez 

In recent years, Bolivarianism's most significant political manifestation was in the government of Venezuela's president Hugo Chávez, who from the beginning of his presidency called himself a Bolivarian patriot and applied his interpretation of several of Bolívar's ideals to everyday affairs, as part of the Bolivarian Revolution. That included the 1999 Constitution, which changed Venezuela's name to the Bolivarian Republic of Venezuela and other ideas such as the Bolivarian Schools, Bolivarian Circles and the Bolivarian University of Venezuela. The term "Bolivarianism" is often used specifically to refer to Chávez's rule.

The central points of Bolivarianism as extolled by Chávez are the following:
 Latin American economic and political sovereignty (anti-imperialism)
 Grassroots political participation of the population via popular votes and referendums (participative democracy)
 Economic self-sufficiency (in food, consumer durables and so on)
 Instilling in people a national ethic of patriotic service
 Equitable distribution of (South America's) vast natural resources
 Eliminating corruption

Chávez's version of Bolivarianism, although drawing heavily from Bolívar's ideals, was also drawn from the writings of Marxist historian Federico Brito Figueroa. Chávez was also influenced by the Hispanic American tradition of cooperativism early in his life, such as that practiced by Jorge Eliécer Gaitán, Fidel Castro, Che Guevara and Salvador Allende. Other key influences on Chávez's political philosophy include Ezequiel Zamora and Simón Rodríguez. Although Chávez himself referred to his ideology as bolivarianismo ("Bolivarianism"), Chávez's supporters and opponents in Venezuela refer to themselves as being either for or against chavismo ("Chavism"). Chávez supporters refer to themselves as chavistas.

Later in his life, Chávez would acknowledge the role that democratic socialism (a form of socialism that calls for democratic institutions in the economy) plays in Bolivarianism. Chávez declared his support for democratic socialism as integral to Bolivarianism, proclaiming that humanity must embrace "a new type of socialism, a humanist one, which puts humans, and not machines or the state, ahead of everything". He later reiterated this sentiment in a 26 February speech at the 4th Summit on Social Debt held in Caracas.

Other definitions and dispute 
Historically, there has been no universally accepted definition as to the proper use of the terms "Bolivarianism" and "Bolivarian" within all the countries in the region. Many leaders, movements and parties have indistinctly used them to describe themselves throughout most of the 19th and 20th centuries.

Panhispanism 

People who have called themselves bolivarianos claim to follow the general ideology expressed in Bolívar's texts such as the Carta de Jamaica and the Discurso de Angostura. Some of Bolívar's ideas include forming a union of Hispanic American countries, providing public education and enforcing sovereignty to fight against foreign invasion, which has been interpreted to include economic domination by foreign powers. An example of such a union was Gran Colombia, a block of countries consisting of Venezuela, Colombia, Panamá (part of New Granada in that time) and Ecuador.

The Colombian insurgent group FARC has in recent years also considered itself to be inspired by Bolívar's ideals and by his role in the 19th century independence struggle against Spain. It has also publicly declared its sympathy towards Chávez and his Bolivarian Revolution, though none of the either confirm or deny any involvement with the insurgent group.

A Venezuelan guerrilla organization, the Bolivarian Forces of Liberation, also espouses Bolivarianism, although it is not known if they have any ties to the Venezuelan government.

Chavismo

Bolivarianism in Venezuela is also referred to (sometimes pejoratively by its opponents) as Chavismo or "Chavezism". Adherents are referred to as Chavistas.

Several political parties in Venezuela support Chavismo. The main party, directly affiliated with Chávez, is the United Socialist Party of Venezuela (PSUV), which replaced the Fifth Republic Movement (Spanish: Movimiento Quinta Republica, usually referred to by the three letters MVR). Other parties and movements supporting Chavismo include the Communist Party of Venezuela and Venezuelan Popular Unity.

The Movement for Socialism (Spanish: Movimiento al Socialismo or MAS) and Radical Cause (Spanish: Causa R) initially supported Chavismo, but they have since distanced themselves from it and now oppose it.

A 2002 article in The Boston Globe said Chavismo "fueled the eruption of public fury that swept the charismatic and confrontational president back into power after a group of military officers deposed him for two days in April in favor of a businessman-president", adding that the "Chavismo phenomenon has almost religious qualities".

Spread 
Bolivarianism has been adopted in Bolivia and Ecuador. Opposition to the spread of Bolivarian ideal resulted in coups in both Bolivia and Guatemala. Afterwards bolivarian aligned governments were democratically elected in Bolivia and Honduras, while defeated in Ecuador.

In 2022 Gustavo Petro won the presidential elections in Colombia, and is considered to be one of the proponents of bolivarianism in South America, as this was the political ideology of the M-19 movement of which he formed part during the 80s, and which became notable for stealing and later returning  Bolivar's alleged sword.
 
Aspects of Bolivarianism were adapted by the Spanish political party Podemos.

See also 
 Bolivarian propaganda
 List of political parties in Venezuela
 Socialism of the 21st century

Notes

 
Eponymous political ideologies
Left-wing politics in Venezuela
Political movements